Yasuni can mean:

 Yasuni National Park in Ecuador
 The Yasuní-ITT Initiative, a proposal to refrain from exploiting oil reserves within the park
 Lophostoma yasuni, a species of bat
 Osteocephalus yasuni, a species of frog
 Yasuni antwren, a bird
 The Yasuní River in Ecuador
 Kit Yasuni, a manufacturer of aftermarket motor cycle and scooter exhaust systems